Wyck is a hamlet in the East Hampshire district of Hampshire, England. It has a total of 24 households, 3 of which are in the Wyck Place Estate. It is a small hamlet with an agricultural heritage and it is walking distance from its closest neighbours, East Worldham and Binsted. It is in the civil parish of Binsted.

History 
There was rumored to be a small monastery on Monkwood Hill which would have owned all the land, but all evidence was destroyed during the reign of Henry VIII. The main feature today is the Old oast house.

External links
 Wyck local community website

External links

Villages in Hampshire